Onward! is a conference sponsored by the SIGPLAN special interest group of the Association for Computing Machinery (ACM). Onward! began in 2002 as a track inside of the OOPSLA conference. Starting in 2009, it was considered a conference, but remained co-located with OOPSLA. When OOPSLA was replaced by SPLASH in 2010, Onward! co-located with SPLASH and one registration fee paid for sessions of either conference.

References

External links
Official Onward! website

Computer science conferences
Association for Computing Machinery conferences
Programming languages conferences